Anna Maria ("Annemiek") Josephine Derckx (born April 12, 1954, in Beegden, Limburg) is a Dutch sprint canoer who competed in the 1980s.  Competing in two Summer Olympics, she earned two bronze medals (1984: K-1 500 m, 1988: K-2 500 m).

Derckx also won two medals in the K-2 500 m event at the ICF Canoe Sprint World Championships with a silver in 1987 and a bronze in 1985.

References
Dutch Olympic Committee profile 

Sports-reference.com profile

1954 births
Living people
Dutch female canoeists
Canoeists at the 1984 Summer Olympics
Canoeists at the 1988 Summer Olympics
ICF Canoe Sprint World Championships medalists in kayak
Medalists at the 1984 Summer Olympics
Medalists at the 1988 Summer Olympics
Olympic canoeists of the Netherlands
Olympic bronze medalists for the Netherlands
Olympic medalists in canoeing
People from Maasgouw
Sportspeople from Limburg (Netherlands)
20th-century Dutch women